Shlomo Argamon is an American/Israeli computer scientist and forensic linguist. He is currently the chair of the computer science department as well as a tenured professor of computer science and director of the Master of Data Science program at Illinois Institute of Technology in Chicago, IL.

Education 
Shlomo Argamon received his B.S. in applied mathematics from Carnegie-Mellon University and his MPhil and Ph.D. in computer science from Yale University, supervised by Drew McDermott. He spent two years doing postdoctoral research under a Fulbright Foundation fellowship with Sarit Kraus at Bar-Ilan University in Ramat Gan, Israel.

Research 
Since the late 1990s, Argamon has worked primarily on computational linguistics analysis of non-denotational meaning, including computational analysis of language stylistics, sentiment analysis, and metaphor analysis. He has also published well-cited research on active learning (machine learning), metalearning, and robotic mapping.

Computational Stylistics 
Argamon is best known for his work on computational stylistics, particularly author profiling. Together with Moshe Koppel and others, he has shown how statistical analysis of word usage can determine an author's age, sex, native language, and personality type with high accuracy in English-language texts. His work has also shown how textual features indicating differences between male and female authorship are consistent between languages and across time.

He has also developed computational stylistic methods that provide insights into the meaning of stylistic differences. One of Argamon's key innovations for this purpose is the development of computational stylistic analysis using systemic functional linguistics. For example, together with Jeff Dodick and Paul Chase, he examined whether there are clear and consistent differences between scientific method in experimental sciences and historical sciences. Their work showed how using systemic functional features in computational stylistic analysis provides evidence for multiple scientific methodologies of the sorts posited previously by philosophers of science.

Forensic Linguistics is viewed through its two major components, first one being Written Language and the Second one being Spoken Language. Written language is mainly used on transcripts for police interviews, for  both the witnesses and the suspects. The transcripts are considered examined text material from criminal messages, terrorist threats or blackmailing messages and translate them from one language to another and then reviewed to help in answering questions about the author if the message. Many different kinds of text materials can be examined, some being notes, phone messages, letters both typed and handwritten as well as text from social medias. Much more can be determined by combining computational stylistics and scientific methods in order to enhance Cybersecurity.

Linguistics for Cybersecurity 
Recently, Argamon has pushed for the increased use of linguistic analysis for attribution of cybersecurity attacks. He has pointed out how linguistic attribution techniques can often be used to good effect on natural language texts that arise in different attack scenarios, and has provided analyses for high-profile cases such as the Sony Pictures hack, the Democratic National Committee cyber attacks, and the Shadow Brokers NSA leak.

Data Science 

In 2013, Argamon founded the Illinois Institute of Technology Master of Data Science program, which he currently directs. The program seeks to teach students "to think about the real problems that need to be solved, not to simply find technical solutions." Argamon views data scientists as "sensemakers", whose job is not merely to produce analytic results, but to help their clients make sense of a complex, uncertain, and fast-changing world through rigorous analysis and explanation of the data.

Honors 
 Fellow of the British Computer Society.
 Distinguished Lecturer in Forensic Linguistics, Centre for Forensic Linguistics, Aston University, 2014.
 Fulbright Foundation Postdoctoral Fellow, 1994-1996.
 Hertz Foundation Doctoral Fellow, 1990-1994.

References 

1967 births
Living people
American people of Israeli descent
Artificial intelligence researchers
Carnegie Mellon University alumni
Computational linguistics researchers
Data scientists
Israeli computer scientists
Linguists from the United States
Yale Graduate School of Arts and Sciences alumni